Events in the year 2011 in Chad.

Incumbents 

 President: Idriss Déby
 Prime Minister: Emmanuel Nadingar

Events

April 

 April – Thousands of Chadians that fled to Libya during the Civil War return to their native country.

July 

 9–22 July – Chadian government asks that Senegal follow through on sending former president Hissène Habré to Belgium to be prosecuted and sentenced for crimes against humanity during his term as president.

August 

 Cholera continues to ravage the populations of Chad, as well as other countries neighboring Lake Chad.

November 

 The Global Environment Facility grants Chad and neighboring countries $20 million to help encourage sustainable practices regarding energy and natural resources.

December 

 December 6 – The Food and Agriculture Organization establish a program to help alleviate hunger in Chad.
 December 8 –  The government of Chad works to build counters to child trafficking within the country.
 December 13 – The International Criminal Court announces that Chad has not met its obligations as a member by failing to arrest Omar al-Bashir in August of the previous year.

References 

 
Years of the 21st century in Chad
2010s in Chad
Chad
Chad